Babushka Adoption Foundation is a charitable non-governmental organization based in Bishkek, the capital city of Kyrgyzstan. It was founded in 1999 by Markus Muller; the director is Aidai Kadyrova.

The main goal of the foundation is to provide support to elderly  people in Kyrgyzstan who do not have any family members that can care for them. This is exactly what its name suggests, as the term "babushka" is Russian for "grandmother" or "old lady".

The objective of Babushka Adoption is not to replace Kyrgyz social institutions, but to work with them to help Kyrgyz pensioners.

A sponsor can adopt an elderly person for 15 euro a month; this amount will help provide clothing, food, medical care, and other important necessities.

Why BA supports the elderly

Kyrgyzstan is today the second-poorest country in Central Asia. A third of the country's population lives below the poverty line and unfortunately this poverty level rises each year.
 
After the collapse of the Soviet Union in 1991, Kyrgyzstan began to reform immediately. But because of the breakup of the Soviet trade bloc and loss of markets, the abandonment of subsidies and the suddenly higher prices of gas and oil the country, which itself has hardly any natural resources, ended up in an economic crisis.

Basic social services provision and pension system became a big question. Kyrgyz citizens who worked hard all their lives for the good of the country where faced with the fact that there was no guarantee of getting a decent pension. At the same time the cost of living was growing and many citizens migrated in search of work, leaving their elderly permanently or without means of survival.

In 1999 Babushka Adoption foundation was established, with financial support of the Swiss Agency for Development and Cooperation (SDC) to help the most vulnerable elderly in Kyrgyzstan. The foundation operates in Bishkek, the capital where most people live and in Batken, the poorest region in the country.

In 2015 Kyrgyzstan participated in the Eurasian Economic Union with Belarus, Kazakhstan, Russia and Armenia, but unfortunately this did not bring the expected export growth. With the new tax rates and the devaluing currency, the living costs have risen again and made life even more difficult for the elderly. At the moment around 57% of the babushkas (grandmothers) and dedushkas (grandfathers) receive pensions below the republic average of 4600 kyrgyz som (around 60 euro). This money is hardly enough for food, after paying taxes and purchasing medications.

How BA helps the elderly

The foundation offers social, moral and financial support to the elderly, encourages mobilization of the elderly and tries to awake the population and the local and national Kyrgyz’ authorities to the problems, with which the elderly are confronted.

To improve the living conditions Babushka Adoption stimulates the elderly through self-help-groups to develop social and income-giving activities. Starting point of all activities is that each person deserves care, respect and dignity.

External links
Babushka Adoption Foundation Official Site
Adopt a babushka scheme takes off by CNN News

1999 establishments in Kyrgyzstan
Organisations based in Kyrgyzstan
Mutual organizations
Organizations established in 1999